Omerkhan Daira is a census town in Rangareddi district in the Indian state of Telangana.

Demographics
 India census, Omerkhan Daira had a population of 7258. Males constitute 60% of the population and females 40%. Omerkhan Daira has an average literacy rate of 73%, higher than the national average of 59.5%: male literacy is 81%, and female literacy is 60%. In Omerkhan Daira, 16% of the population is under 6 years of age.

References

Cities and towns in Ranga Reddy district